Ford Hospital and Research Centre (FHRC) was established in Patna, Bihar, India in Year 2008 and officially inaugurated by Chief Minister of Bihar Shri Nitish Kumar on 24 August 2010, with the sole objective of providing advance healthcare services to the people of Bihar. The first phase of the hospital was commissioned on 24 August 2010 with 60 beds. The hospital has now expanded to 105 beds and is the one among the largest private hospital of Bihar.

Infrastructure
The Hospital provides diagnostic facilities and complete treatment, surgery, rehabilitation and Cardiac care under one roof. Most diagnostic and therapeutic procedures are available here.

The department of radiology and imaging offers facilities for CT scans, mammography, ultrasonography, echocardiography, endoscopies, digital radiography, CT and ultrasound-guided procedures.

Departments

The main departments at Ford Hospital are:
 Cardiology
 Gastroenterology
 Neurology
 Urology
 Orthopedics
 ENT
 Pediatrics
 Gynecology
 Internal Medicine
 Dermatology
 Dental
 Diabetology
 Endocrinology
 Nephrology
 Ophthalmology
 Plastic Surgery
 Pain Clinic
 Pulmonology
 Occupational Therapy
 Surgical Oncology
 Radiology & Imaging
 Pathology & Blood Bank
 Anesthesiology and ICU
 Allied Services
 Medical Records
 Physiotherapy

See also
 List of hospitals in India

References

Hospital buildings completed in 2010
Hospitals in Patna
2008 establishments in Bihar